Mount Steere is a prominent shield volcano standing 6.4 km (4 mi) NNW of Mount Frakes in the Crary Mountains of Marie Byrd Land, Antarctica.

Mapped by USGS from ground surveys and U.S. Navy air photos, 1959–66. Named by US-ACAN for William C. Steere, biologist at McMurdo Station, 1964–65 season.

See also
 List of volcanoes in Antarctica

Sources
 
 

Polygenetic shield volcanoes
Volcanoes of Marie Byrd Land
Crary Mountains